Green River Cemetery is a cemetery in the hamlet of Springs, New York within the Town of East Hampton.

The cemetery was originally intended for the blue collar local families (called Bonackers) of the Springs neighborhood who supported the ocean mansions in East Hampton (village), New York.  Families with long histories in the region are interred there, including the Millers, Kings, Bennetts, and Talmages.

However, after Jackson Pollock was buried on a hill there in 1956, it became famous as the artists' and writers' cemetery.  Headstones have become works of art.

Despite its name, there are no rivers near the cemetery.

Notable burials

 Peter Boyle (1935–2006) – actor
 James Brooks (painter) (1906–1992) – abstract painter
 Dan Christensen (1942–2007) – artist
 Fred Coe (1914–1979) – television producer of The Philco Television Playhouse
 Stuart Davis (painter) (1892[94?]–1964) – cubist artist
 Elaine de Kooning (1918–1989) – artist and wife of abstract expressionist Willem de Kooning, who is not buried there
 Jimmy Ernst (1920–1984) – artist and son of Max Ernst
 Pierre Franey (1921–1996) – chef and newspaper columnist
 John Ferren (1905–1970) – abstract artist and painter
 Rae Ferren (1929–2016) – impressionist artist and painter
 Perle Fine (1905–1988) – artist
 Henry Geldzahler (1935–1994) – art historian, critic, museum curator and NYC Commissioner of Cultural Affairs
 Charles Gwathmey (1938–2009) – architect
 J.B. Handelsman (1922–2007) – cartoonist
 Lee Krasner (1908–1984) – artist and wife of Jackson Pollock
 Ibram Lassaw (1913–2003) – abstract sculptor
 William S. Lieberman (1923–2005) – Museum of Modern Art curator
 A.J. Liebling (1904–1963) – newspaper columnist
 Alan Manson (1919–2002) – actor 
 Gary McFarland (1933–1971) – musician, composer, leader, music producer
 Kyle R. Morris (1818–1979) – artist
 Hilda Morley (1916–1998) – poet
 Frank O'Hara (1926–1966) – poet
 John Opper (1908–1994) – abstract painter
 Alfonso A. Ossorio (1916–1990) – artist (half his ashes are here)
 Alan J. Pakula (1928–1998) – film producer of To Kill a Mockingbird, film director of Klute and All the President's Men
 Jackson Pollock (1912–1956) – abstract expressionist painter and husband of Lee Krasner
 Abraham Rattner (1895–1978) – painter
 Ad Reinhardt (1913–1967) – abstract painter
 Harold Rosenberg (1906–1978) – art critic
 Steven J. Ross (1927–1992) – CEO who engineered the merger of Time-Warner
 Jean Stafford (1915–1979) – Pulitzer Prize–winning writer
 Stan Vanderbeek (1927–1983) – underground film maker
 Hannah Wilke (1940–1993) – painter, sculptor and photographer
 Stefan Wolpe (1902–1972) – composer
 Jan Yoors (1922–1977) – artist and writer

References

External links
 East Hampton Star history of cemetery
 Findagrave profile
 Rootsweb profile
 Newsday history of Long Island

East Hampton (town), New York
Cemeteries in Suffolk County, New York